Kahnuj (also Romanized as Kahnūj) is a village in Ravar Rural District, in the Central District of Ravar County, Kerman Province, Iran. At the 2006 census, its population was 376, in 105 families.

References 

Populated places in Ravar County